Baskette is the surname of the following people:

Billy Baskette (1884–1949), American pianist and composer 
Jim Baskette (1887–1942), American Major League Baseball pitcher 
Michael Baskette, American music producer

See also
Baskett (surname)
Basket (disambiguation)